The Floßbach, called the Landgraben in its upper course where, to distinguish it from other streams with the same name, it is also qualified by being referred to as the Grünstädter or Grünstadter Landgraben, is an 8.1-kilometre-long stream and an orographically left-hand headstream of the Eckbach in the northern part of the Anterior Palatinate in the German state of Rhineland-Palatinate. The stream runs entirely on the territory of the town of Grünstadt and the two villages of Obersülzen und Dirmstein that belong to the collective municipality of Grünstadt-Land.

References

Literature

External links 

 OSM: Verlauf des Floßbachs

Anterior Palatinate
Bad Dürkheim (district)
1Flossbach